A caparison is a cloth covering laid over a horse or other animal for protection and decoration. In modern times, they are used mainly in parades and for historical reenactments. A similar term is horse-trapper. The word is derived from the Latin caparo, meaning a cape.

Horses
In antiquity, a "magnificently caparisoned horse" takes a central place in a vision reported in the deutero-canonical text, which prevents the Seleucid emissary Heliodorus from a planned assault on the Jewish temple treasury in Jerusalem.

In the Middle Ages, caparisons were part of the horse armour known as barding, which was worn during battle and tournaments. They were adopted in the twelfth century in response to conditions of campaigning in the Crusades, where local armies employed archers, both on foot and horse, in large quantities. The covering might not completely protect the horse against the arrows but it could deflect and lessen their damage.

An early depiction of a knight's horse wearing a caparison may be seen on the small Carlton-in-Lindrick knight figurine from the late 12th century. Modern re-enactment tests have shown that a loose caparison protects the horse reasonably well against arrows, especially if combined with a gambeson-like undercloth underneath. Medieval caparisons were frequently embroidered with the coat of arms of the horse's rider.

In 1507 a horse disguised as a unicorn at the tournament of the Wild Knight and the Black Lady in Edinburgh had a caparison of black and white damask lined with canvas. A caparison made of red taffeta for the horse James VI of Scotland in June 1591 may have been intended for a masque performed at Tullibardine Castle. Velvet caparisons lined with buckram were made for Henrietta Maria and her gentlewomen in 1630s.

Domesticated and temple elephants of India

In the Indian state of Kerala, elephants are decorated during temple festivals.   They wear a distinctive golden head covering called a nettipattam, which is often translated into English as an elephant caparison.  However, it covers only the head, not the body, as in a horse caparison.

See also
 Horses in the Middle Ages
 Barding
 Horses in warfare
 Temple elephant
 War elephant
 Horse blanket

References

External links
 Caparisons in 13th–17th century illustrations and artwork
 A caparison made for the wedding-celebration of Gustaf II Adolf of Sweden and Maria Eleonora of Brandenburg, 1621
 Caparisons in the 14th-century German – Codex Manesse

Animal armour
Horse protective equipment
Horse ornamentation
Barding